Takino (Täkä) is a rural locality (a village) in Rostovsky Selsoviet, Mechetlinsky District, Bashkortostan, Russia. The population was 331 as of 2010. There are 3 streets.

Geography 
Takino is located 33 km northeast of Bolsheustyikinskoye (the district's administrative centre) by road. Telyashevo is the nearest rural locality.

References 

Rural localities in Mechetlinsky District